The Mortal Storm is a 1937 novel by the British writer Phyllis Bottome. An anti-Nazi novel it depicts the impact of Adolf Hitler's regime on a German family, and their conversion to resistance against the Third Reich.

Film adaptation
In 1940 it was made into the film The Mortal Storm by the Hollywood studio MGM, directed by Frank Borzage and starring Margaret Sullavan, James Stewart and Robert Young.

References

Bibliography
 Goble, Alan. The Complete Index to Literary Sources in Film. Walter de Gruyter, 1999.
 Spiro, Mia. Anti-Nazi Modernism: The Challenges of Resistance in 1930s Fiction. Northwestern University Press, 2012.

1937 British novels
Novels by Phyllis Bottome
Novels set in Germany
Faber and Faber books
British novels adapted into films